Fenerivia is a genus of flowering plants in the custard apple and soursop family Annonaceae, with all species endemic to Madagascar. Fenerivia inflorescences have a prominent flange below the perianth, which is unique to the genus. The complete chloroplast genome of Fenerivia ghesquiereana was published in 2021.

Species
There are nine accepted species:
Fenerivia angustielliptica (G.E. Schatz & Le Thomas) R.M.K. Saunders
Fenerivia capuronii (Cavaco & Keraudren) R.M.K. Saunders
Fenerivia chapelieri (Baill.) R.M.K. Saunders
Fenerivia emarginata (Diels) R.M.K. Saunders
Fenerivia ghesquiereana (Cavaco & Keraudren) R.M.K. Saunders
Fenerivia humbertii (Cavaco & Keraudren) R.M.K. Saunders
Fenerivia madagascariensis (Cavaco & Keraudren) R.M.K. Saunders
Fenerivia oligosperma (Danguy) R.M.K.Saunders
Fenerivia richardiana (Baill.) R.M.K. Saunders

References

Annonaceae genera
Endemic flora of Madagascar
Annonaceae